Our Lady of Purification Catholic Church is a historic church at Camino Real and 2nd Street in Dona Ana, New Mexico. It was built around 1844 and added to the National Register of Historic Places in 1985.

Also known as Yglesia de Nuestra Senora de Candelaria de Dona Ana, it is adobe vernacular in style.

It is notable as the oldest example of an adobe vernacular church in southern New Mexico.  According to its National Register nomination, its ornamentation and detail "is simple, reflecting the modest resources of the congregation that built it in the middle of the 19th century. The building is of a cruciform floor plan with thick walls made of adobe brick molded by the parishioners and carried up to the site from the valley land below. Until the 1920s, when it was covered with tongue and groove hardwood, the floor was of dirt which often had to be wetted to keep the dust down. As shown by the oldest available photograph of the church taken around 1910, it was built with a flat roof using the traditional viga (beam) and latilla (small poles laid across the vigas) ceiling, and sealed with packed mud that would routinely have to be maintained. This stark, massive structure of earth had a plain twin-leafed entrance with a small window above it. The windows along the church walls are the 6 over 6 double hung wood type. It was probably around the turn of the century that a small wood-louvered bell tower was built above the entrance. The church faces south onto an open dirt plaza which now serves as parking. A garden bordering the east side of the church is enclosed with a stone wall which features an open arch parallel to the church entry."

It is also a contributing building in the Dona Ana Village Historic District, listed on the National Register in 1996.

See also

National Register of Historic Places listings in Doña Ana County, New Mexico

References

External links

Roman Catholic churches in New Mexico
Churches on the National Register of Historic Places in New Mexico
Roman Catholic churches completed in 1865
Churches in Doña Ana County, New Mexico
National Register of Historic Places in Doña Ana County, New Mexico
Adobe churches in New Mexico
1865 establishments in New Mexico Territory
19th-century Roman Catholic church buildings in the United States